Yvonne Fedderson (born Yvonne Glee Lime; April 7, 1935) is an American philanthropist and retired actress. She was married to producer Don Fedderson.

She appeared on screen from 1956 to 1968. Thereafter, she devoted much of her time to philanthropy. She played the starring role of Joyce Martin in the movie "High School Hellcats" (1958), and played Arlene Logan in I Was a Teenage Werewolf (1957).

Background
She was born Yvonne Glee Lime in Glendale, California, the daughter of a music teacher who encouraged her to become an actress. She graduated in 1953 from Glendale High School, having obtained a special permit to attend there, rather than the otherwise assigned Hoover High School. Lime recalls her years at Glendale High School with jubilation:Growing up in the '40s and '50s was great! You felt safe in school, and looked forward to every day. Seeing your friends each day, getting an education, and planning for the future were adventures we welcomed. Our dances and social events were fun, and our parents never had to worry about our using drugs, or having someone going crazy with a gun and shooting a group of us. ... My years at Glendale High were a time of ponytails and poodle skirts for the girls, and crew cuts and hot rods for the boys. A girl dreamed of "going steady" with a guy, especially if he had a letterman sweater that she could wear. Everyone looked forward to the semester breaks, and Easter vacation week was always a time to go to Balboa Island with your friends. ...

After high school, Lime attended the Pasadena Playhouse, where her performance in a production of Eugene O'Neill's Ah, Wilderness! attracted the attention of an agent. This landed her into the recurring part of Dottie Snow on twelve episodes of Robert Young's situation comedy, Father Knows Best. She played a friend of Betty Anderson.

Acting and philanthropy
Her first film appearance was in The Rainmaker (1956), as Snookie Maguire. In 1957, she was cast in films, in an uncredited part as Sally in Elvis Presley's Loving You and in Michael Landon's I Was a Teenage Werewolf, and with top billing in Dragstrip Riot (1958).

She and TV producer Don Fedderson married in 1969, and had a daughter, Dionne Fedderson; he had seven children from two previous marriages

After she married Fedderson, Lime left acting to concentrate her time to philanthropy. In the 1950s, she entertained American troops stationed in Japan. Lime and actress Sara Buckner O'Meara, who met when they were guest stars on The Adventures of Ozzie and Harriet, launched International Orphans Inc., a charity that built and maintained four orphanages in Japan and five orphanages, a hospital, and a school in Vietnam. Lime and O'Meara later devoted their efforts to assist neglected children in the United States and renamed their group, Childhelp, an organization based in Scottsdale, Arizona. The two were also involved in Operation Babylift at the time of the American military evacuation during the Fall of Saigon.
 
From 1960 to 1961, Lime co-starred as Sally Day on the NBC sitcom, Happy. She and Ronnie Burns played owners of a motel in southern California who have a talking baby, Happy. She also appeared in varying roles from 1956 to 1958 in eleven episodes of The George Burns and Gracie Allen Show.
 
Lime's first television appearance was on her future husband's The Millionaire as Eileen in "The Story of Joy Costello." She appeared in 1956 as Mary Lou Carter in the episode, "The Select Females," of the CBS/series The Adventures of Jim Bowie. In 1957, she portrayed Gloria Binks in the Hardy Boys serial, The Mystery of the Ghost Farm. That same year she played Mary in "A Coney Island Wedding" on the ABC series Crossroads. In 1958, she played Iris on "Ladies' Aide", an episode of The People's Choice.
 
From 1959 to 1961, she appeared twice each on two CBS sitcoms, The Many Loves of Dobie Gillis and Bringing Up Buddy. Lime also was cast in episodes of NBC's Wichita Town and Bat Masterson, and on CBS's Gomer Pyle, U.S.M.C. Her last acting role was on her husband's sitcom My Three Sons as Linda in the 1968 episode "The Grandfathers".

Later years
Fedderson and her daughter, Dionne, reside in Paradise Valley, Arizona. She is the author of Miracle Healing: God's Call: Testimonials of Miracles Through Sara Buckner O'Meara, published in 2011.

Sources

References

External links
 
 
 
 

1935 births
Living people
Actresses from Glendale, California
American television actresses
American film actresses
American philanthropists
Glendale High School (Glendale, California) alumni
People from Paradise Valley, Arizona
American non-fiction writers
21st-century American women